Giuseppe Laveni (born 1877, date of death unknown) was an Italian sports shooter. He competed in three events at the 1924 Summer Olympics.

References

External links
 

1877 births
Year of death missing
Italian male sport shooters
Olympic shooters of Italy
Shooters at the 1924 Summer Olympics
Sportspeople from Milan